is a former Japanese rugby union player who played as a hooker. He spent his whole career playing for Kobelco Steelers in Japan's domestic Top League, playing over 35 times. He was named in the Japan squad for the 2007 Rugby World Cup, making 3 appearances in the tournament. He made a further 20 appearances for Japan in his career, scoring two tries.

References

External links
itsrugby.co.uk profile

1979 births
Living people
People from Shimonoseki
Japanese rugby union players
Rugby union hookers
Kobelco Kobe Steelers players